A Thousand Blows is an upcoming British boxing drama television series created by Steven Knight, about the Forty Elephants, a 19th to 20th century all-female London crime syndicate who specialized in shoplifting. 

A Thousand Blows will be released on Disney+, and will contain six episodes.

Premise 
The series follows the fortunes of Hezekiah and Alec, two best friends newly arrived from Jamaica. Fighting for survival in the violent melting pot of Victorian London’s East End, they come up against Sugar Goodson, a dangerous, veteran boxer.

Cast 
 Malachi Kirby as Hezekiah Moscow
 Stephen Graham as Sugar Goodson
 Erin Doherty as Mary Carr
 Francis Lovehall as Alec Munroe
 Jason Tobin
 James Nelson-Joyce
 Nadia Albina
 Jemma Carlton
 Caoilfhionn Dunne

Production 
In August 2022, it was revealed that a boxing drama television series titled  Thousand Blows was in development, with Steven Knight set as the showrunner and executive producer of the series. It depicts the Forty Elephants, a 19th to 20th century all-female London crime syndicate who specialized in shoplifting. Tinge Krishnan is attached as the lead director and executive producer, with Malachi Kirby cast in the lead role, alongside Stephen Graham, Erin Doherty, Francis Lovehall, Jason Tobin, James Nelson-Joyce, Nadia Albina, Morgan Hilaire, Jemma Carlton, and Caoilfhionn Dunne.

Filming 
Principal photography began in March 2023, in London.

References

External links 
 

Upcoming television series
2020s British drama television series
Disney+ original programming
English-language television shows
British historical television series
Television series based on actual events
Television shows filmed in the United Kingdom